Kalewadi (Marathi: काळेवाडी) is a suburb of Pune in the Indian state of Maharashtra. Kalewadi mainly consists of the following areas: Nadhe Nagar, Vijay Nagar, Jyotiba Nagar, Kokane Nagar, Pavana Nagar, and Tapkir Nagar and Aliwadi, Melvinwadi and Libinnewadi.

Transport 
It is about 15 km from Pune Railway Station. Kalewadi is connected to Pimpri by Pavna bridge, to Chinchwad via Hedgewar Bridge, to Wakad via Kalewadi phata, and to Rahatani. 

कळवाडी गाव हे फौजींच माहेर घर आहे।

Culture 
People at Kalewadi celebrate the Bull festival "Pola," Navratra mahotsav, Ganapati, and Chatrapati Shivaji Maharaj Jayanti. Farmers who originally belonged to Kalewadi include Nadhe, Kale, Kokane, Tapkir and Nakhate. Nadhe constitute the majority of the farmer community. The village celebrates annual fair of Peer.

Education 
  Nirmal Bethany High School, Vijay Nagar, Kalewadi.
  Parvati English Medium High School.
  EuroSchool Wakad
 Om Saint High School
 Kalewadi PCMC Primary School
 M.M. Secondary School Kalewadi
 SMT. Laxmibai Tapkir Secondary School
 Alphonsa High School, Vijay Nagar, Kalewadi.
 Rodger's School
 Baby's English high school

Temples 
 Hanuman mandir Near NadhePatil Residence.
 Durga Mata Mandir
 Radha Krishna Temple
 Ayyapa Mandir
 Jain Mandir
 Dhangarbaba Mandir
 ST. Alphonsa Church, Vijay Nagar, Kalewadi.
 Panch Peer Chowk Main Road   of kalewadi

See also 
 Chinchwad
 Wakad
 Pimpri

References

Neighbourhoods in Pimpri-Chinchwad